The Texas Law Review is a student-edited and -produced law review affiliated with the University of Texas School of Law (Austin). It ranks number 6 on Washington & Lee University's list, number 11 on Google Scholar's list of top publications in law, and number 4 in Mikhail Koulikov's rankings of law reviews by social impact. The Review publishes seven issues per year, six of which include articles, book reviews, essays, commentaries, and notes. The seventh issue is traditionally its symposium issue, which is dedicated to articles on a particular topic. The Review also publishes the Texas Law Review Manual on Usage & Style and the Texas Rules of Form: The Greenbook, both currently in their fourteenth editions. The Texas Law Review is wholly owned by a parent corporation, the Texas Law Review Association, rather than by the school.

Admission to the Review is obtained through a "write-on" process at the end of each academic year. Well over half of each class applies for admission every year and approximately fifty are invited to join. Those selected students join the students from the previous year to form the Review's membership. About twenty of these students constitute the editorial board, which is selected early each spring semester.

The Texas Law Review was established in December 1922 by Leon A. Green, Ira P. Hildebrand, and Ireland Graves. Its Bluebook abbreviation is Tex. L. Rev. but abbreviates itself by its own editorial convention as Texas L. Rev.

Notable alumni 

 Linda L. Addison, Partner-in-Charge, New York, Fulbright & Jaworski
 James Baker, former United States Secretary of State, Secretary of the Treasury & White House Chief of Staff
 Marian Oldfather Boner,  legal scholar
 William Curtis Bryson, United States Court of Appeals for the Federal Circuit
 Jerry Buchmeyer, United States District Judge, Northern District of Texas
 Greg Coleman, first solicitor-general of Texas
 Ben Clarkson Connally, former Chief Judge, United States District Court, Southern District of Texas
 Gregg Costa, United States Court of Appeals for the Fifth Circuit
 Finis E. Cowan, former United States District Judge, Southern District of Texas
 Lloyd Doggett, United States Congressman, Former Justice of the Texas Supreme Court
 Walter Raleigh Ely Jr., former Judge, United States Court of Appeals for the Ninth Circuit
 David Frederick, appellate attorney; has argued cases before the United States Supreme Court
 Bryan A. Garner, editor in chief of Black's Law Dictionary, coauthor with Justice Antonin Scalia on Reading Law and Making Your Case
 Thomas Gibbs Gee, United States Court of Appeals for the Fifth Circuit
 Joe R. Greenhill, former Justice & Chief Justice of the Texas Supreme Court
 James Wesley Hendrix, United States District Judge, Northern District of Texas
 Harry Lee Hudspeth, Chief United States District Judge, Western District of Texas
 Edith Jones, Chief Judge, United States Court of Appeals for the Fifth Circuit
 George P. Kazen, United States District Judge, Southern District of Texas
 W. Page Keeton, former Dean of The University of Texas School of Law and author of Prosser & Keeton on Torts
 Robert Keeton, United States District Judge, District of Massachusetts
 Baine Kerr, former President, Pennzoil, Inc.
 Robert Lanier, Former Mayor of Houston
 Stephen Susman (1941-2020), plaintiffs attorney and a founding partner of Susman Godfrey
 Diane Wood, United States Court of Appeals for the Seventh Circuit
 Lisa Blatt, Chair of Williams & Connolly’s Supreme Court and Appellate practice

References

External links 
 

American law journals
University of Texas School of Law
Publications established in 1922
English-language journals
7 times per year journals
General law journals
Law journals edited by students